The Waziristan Accord (or North Waziristan Accord) was an agreement between the government of Pakistan and tribals resident in the Waziristan area to mutually cease hostilities in North Waziristan (a district in the Federally Administered Tribal Areas of Pakistan). The agreement was signed on 5 September 2006 in the North Waziristan town of Miranshah. The agreement effectively ended the Waziristan War, fought between the Pakistani military and rebels in the border region with ties to the Taliban and Al-Qaeda. However, recent attacks by the pro-Taliban militants suggest that the truce has been broken by the militants who attacked and killed 50 Pakistanis including soldiers and police. The attacks are also believed to have been as a retaliation for the Lal Masjid attacks by Pakistan Army.

Initial reports characterized the accord as an agreement with the Taliban. However, the Government of Pakistan has strenuously denied that the Taliban were party to the accord, nor that the accord is a deal with the Taliban.  News sources continue to report that the Taliban fighters exert significant and perhaps dominant control over the area, and were the main force behind the peace agreement (see Islamic Emirate of Waziristan). Voice of America reports, for instance, that the pact received the blessing of Mullah Omar, the former leader of the Islamic Emirate of Afghanistan.

Details of the accord
The accord consists of 16 clauses and 4 sub-clauses.  The major points include:

The Government agrees to stop air and ground attacks against militants in Waziristan.
Militants are to cease cross-border movement into and out of Afghanistan.
Foreigners (understood to mean foreign jihadists) in North Waziristan will have to leave Pakistan but "those who cannot leave will be allowed to live peacefully, respecting the law of the land and the agreement" (wording from Dawn newspaper article).
Area check-points and border patrols will be staffed and operated by a tribal force. Pakistan Army forces will withdraw from control points.
No parallel administration will be established in the area. The law of the Government shall remain in force.
The Government agrees to follow local customs and traditions in resolving issues.
Tribal leaders will ensure that no one attacks law enforcement personnel or damages state property.
Tribesmen will not carry heavy weapons. Small arms are allowed.
Militants will not enter agencies adjacent to this agency (the agency of North Waziristan).
Both sides will return any captured weapons, vehicles, and communication devices.
The Government will release captured militants and will not arrest them again.
The Government will pay compensation for property damage and deaths of innocent civilians in the area.

Perspectives on the accord

Mood in Pakistan
Some Islamabad-based observers view the truce accord as a prelude to hot pursuit chases of mujahideen into Pakistan by NATO forces operating in Afghanistan.  They view it as a defeat for the principle of territorial integrity of Pakistan.

Pervez Musharraf has said,"This treaty is not to deal with the Taliban. It is actually to fight the Taliban." Former Pakistan cricket captain and leader of a political party, Imran Khan stated "Waziristan has been a disaster; there's been a disgraceful withdrawal from there. The Pakistan Army has been defeated"

Comments by Afghanistan's Foreign Minister
Afghan Foreign Minister Rangeen Dadfar Spanta said the peace accord in North Waziristan is insufficient.  He commented to the BBC:

I believe this is a cardinal mistake to believe that Waziristan is the only centre of terrorist activity. I think it is [in] a lot of other places in our region and a lot of organisations and also madrassas [religious schools], that they are the centre of terrorist activity.

From the White House
White House spokesman Tony Snow, commenting on 7 September 2006, said that Islamabad had given the US assurances that the ceasefire accord would not undermine the hunt for Osama bin Laden and the agreement was aimed at combating extremism.

From the Taliban
Commenting immediately after the accord, Abdullah Farhad, a local Taliban spokesman, said there were no foreign fighters in the area, and if there were, the Government should have provided evidence of their existence.

Views from third parties
The deal has been severely criticized in the western press with one editorial describing it as "the terms of surrender by Pakistan to the Taliban and al Qaeda". Another column termed it as an "unconditional surrender of Waziristan" by Pakistan, adding that the deal is "a boon to the terrorists and a humiliation for the Pakistani government." Some other newspapers have commented that the deal is a "short-term defeat" that risked the wrath of its US allies to secure "long-term strategic gains"; and quoted a retired Pakistan general as saying it was a "tactical retreat". Additionally, it was argued that "since initiated, all of the deals have failed, precipitating a resurgence of Taliban hostilities."

An "Islamic Emirate of Waziristan" and the Accord

Some commentators have seen the Waziristan accord as giving de facto sovereignty to rebel factions in the region, or at least some form of autonomy or quasi-independence. This perspective, as well as actions taken by these organizations that are usually performed by autonomous countries, has led to the use of names such as the "Islamic Emirate of Waziristan" or the "Islamic State of Waziristan" to describe the rebel organizations that wield power in Waziristan.

In 2007, the main supporter of the truce Chairman joint chiefs, Gen. Ehsan ul Haq, the main author of the accord and supporter, openly testified the failure to end the violence and expulsion of Central Asian and Afghan Arabs in the country noting that, "the al-Qaeda and the Taliban militants used the peace agreement to regroup and carry out terrorist attacks in both Pakistan and Afghanistan.

References 

Peace treaties of Pakistan
Waziristan
Taliban
History of Pakistan
Counterterrorism
Wars involving the Taliban
Treaties of Pakistan
Treaties concluded in 2006
Insurgency in Khyber Pakhtunkhwa
Treaties entered into force in 2006